Opuntia littoralis is a species of prickly pear cactus known by the common name coastal pricklypear. It is sometimes called the sprawling prickly pear due to its short stems and habit of growing close to the ground. "Littoral" means "pertaining to the seashore".

Distribution
Opuntia littoralis is native to southern California and Baja California, where it grows in coastal sage scrub and chaparral habitats. The cactus is variable in appearance; there are several varieties and hybrids with similar species are commonly found.

Description
Opuntia littoralis generally grows in dense clumps spreading several meters wide and up to a meter-3 feet tall. The flowers are pale yellow to dull red occurring in May to June. The fruit is edible.

References

External links

CalFlora Database — Opuntia littoralis
Jepson Manual Treatment: Opuntia littoralis
Opuntia littoralis Photo gallery
Opuntia littoralis photo gallery at Opuntia Web

littoralis
Cacti of Mexico
Cacti of the United States
Flora of California
Flora of Baja California
Desert fruits
Natural history of the California chaparral and woodlands
Natural history of the Channel Islands of California
Natural history of the Peninsular Ranges
Natural history of the Santa Monica Mountains
Natural history of the Transverse Ranges